The 2018–19 Presbyterian Blue Hose men's basketball team represented Presbyterian College during the 2018–19 NCAA Division I men's basketball season. The Blue Hose, led by second-year head coach Dustin Kerns, played their home games at the Templeton Physical Education Center in Clinton, South Carolina as members of the Big South Conference. They finished the season 20–16, 9–7 in Big South play to finish in a four-way tie for fifth place. They defeated UNC Asheville in the first round of the Big South tournament before losing in the quarterfinals to Radford. They were invited to the CollegeInsider.com  Tournament, their first ever Division I post season tournament, where they defeated Seattle and Robert Morris to advance to the quarterfinals where they lost to Marshall.

Previous season
The Blue Hose finished the season 11–21, 4–14 in Big South play to finish in ninth place. They lost in the first round of the Big South tournament to Charleston Southern.

Roster

Schedule and results

|-
!colspan=9 style=| Non-conference regular season

|-
!colspan=9 style=| Big South regular season

|-
!colspan=9 style=|Big South tournament

|-
!colspan=12 style=|CollegeInsider.com Postseason tournament
|-

References

Presbyterian Blue Hose men's basketball seasons
Presbyterian
Presbyterian
Presbyterian
Presbyterian